Edmund Veesenmayer (12 November 1904 – 24 December 1977) was a high-ranking  German SS functionary and Holocaust-perpetrator during the Nazi era. He significantly contributed to the Holocaust in Hungary and in the Independent State of Croatia (NDH). Veesenmayer was a subordinate of Ernst Kaltenbrunner and Joachim von Ribbentrop, and worked with Adolf Eichmann. He was involved in dismembering  Czecho-Slovakia in 1939,
in the establishment of the Ustaše-run NDH puppet state following the April 1941 German invasion of Yugoslavia, and in the selection and installation of the 1941-1944 puppet regime of Milan Nedić in the German-occupied territory of Serbia. After World War II Veesenmayer was tried and convicted at the Ministries Trial; in 1949 he was sentenced to 20 years' imprisonment, but was released after serving two years.

Early life

Veesenmayer was the son of school teacher Franz Xaver Veesenmayer from Oberstaufen in Kempten (Allgäu). From 1923–1926 he studied political science in Munich, where he received a doctorate in political science in 1928. After, he taught at the Political-Economic Institute of the Technical University of Munich for four years.

Schenker AG career 
Veesenmayer served on the advisory committee of the German transportation firm Schenker AG, which played a key role in moving Nazi plunder throughout  Europe between 1938 and 1945.

SS career

Veesenmayer joined the Nazi Party (NSDAP) in November 1932 and the SS in 1934. By 1934 he had obtained a position in Hitler's economic affairs office in Berlin. Before the July Putsch, he worked on aligning rivaling factions of the outlawed Austrian Nazi Party, forcing the resignation of Chancellor Kurt Schuschnigg, and establishing key economic connections between Austria and Germany. For this effort he was promoted to SS-Standartenführer in March 1938. His next job was dismembering Czechoslovakia and making Jozef Tiso's Slovakia subservient to Nazi Germany in March 1939. In August of the same year he worked on intelligence gathering in the Free City of Danzig where he worked on various measures designed to heighten tensions between Poland and Germany. For these efforts he was awarded the Danzig Cross Second Class. He joined influential business circles, making many friends in high places. From March 1940 to July 1943 he was entrusted with planning to move the (neutral) Irish Free State against Britain.

At the beginning of 1941 he was attached to the German diplomatic staff in Zagreb. Here, he arranged (with Ustashe leader Slavko Kvaternik) the proclamation of the Independent State of Croatia, four hours before the Germans entered the city. What Ante Pavelic meant by "independence", as Veesenmeyer reported to Berlin, was firstly to obtain German recognition of Croatia; and secondly, an opportunity to thank Hitler in person and promise him "to live and die for the Führer". Veesenmayer played an important role in the persecution and murder of Croatian and Serbian Jewry. He was involved in an operation to overthrow the Hungarian government in 1944. On 15 March 1944 he was promoted to SS-Brigadeführer and became Reich plenipotentiary after the German occupation of Hungary. From March to October the same year he was involved in organising the Final Solution for Hungary's Jews.

In a telegram dated 13 June 1944 he reported to the Foreign Office: “transport Jews from Carpathian Mountains and Transylvania space … with a total of 289,357 Jews in 92 complete trains of 45 cars”. On 15 June 1944 Veesenmayer told Joachim von Ribbentrop in a telegram that some 340,000 Jews had been delivered to the Reich. He also announced that after the final settlement of the Jewish question, the number of deported Hungarian Jews would reach 900,000.

Trial and conviction 
In the Ministries Trial in 1949, Veesenmayer received a sentence of 20 years' imprisonment for crimes against humanity, slavery and membership in a criminal organization. In 1951, that was reduced to 10 years by U.S. High Commissioner of Germany John J. McCloy under massive pressure from the West German government and public. Veesenmayer was released on 16 December 1951.

After his release, between 1952 and 1955, Veesenmayer worked in Tehran as a representative of Toepfer, a German commodity trading company. At the end of his life, he lived in Darmstadt, where he died in 1977.

Notes

Sources

Further reading
 Reitlinger, Gerald, The SS – Alibi of a Nation, Viking (Da Capo reprint), New York 1957 
 (German-language biography) Igor-Philip Matić: Edmund Veesenmayer. Agent und Diplomat der nationalsozialistischen Expansionspolitik. Oldenbourg 2002, .

1904 births
1977 deaths
People from Bad Kissingen
Nazi Party politicians
Holocaust perpetrators in Hungary
Holocaust perpetrators in Yugoslavia
Ambassadors of Germany to Hungary
People convicted by the United States Nuremberg Military Tribunals
Nazis convicted of war crimes
German people convicted of crimes against humanity
SS-Brigadeführer
Jewish Croatian history
Academic staff of the Technical University of Munich
People from the Kingdom of Bavaria
Recipients of the Knights Cross of the War Merit Cross